Wishbone and The Amazing Odyssey is a computer program published by Palladium Interactive and Big Feats Entertainment in 1996 featuring Wishbone (voiced by Larry Brantley) from the Wishbone television series on PBS. Players try to help Wishbone get out of the combobulator while learning Greek mythology and history.

Cast
 Larry Brantley as the voice of Wishbone
 Soccer the Dog as Wishbone
 Lynn Mathis as Poseidon
 Charles Sprinkle as Telemachus
 Matthew Tompkins as Suitor #1
 Cliff Stephens as Suitor #2
 Jeanne Simpson as Kalypso
 Sally Vahle Nystuen as Penelope

Plot
Wishbone has been zapped inside the combobulator and the only way out is to re-enact Homer's Odyssey. The game begins in Troy, where the player picks up the crew roster and some wine. The game then passes through the cave of Polyphemus, Aeaea and Circe, Scylla or Charybdis, Thrinacia and finally home to Ithaca, where the player must win an archery contest to win Penelope.

Additionally, the game gives access to the Knowledge Vault, an online source of information about Homer's Odyssey.

Losing
A loser finds themself in the Underworld, where Hades challenges Wishbone to a game in which he must beat Hades to the magical potion of Asclepius. Winning the challenge takes the player back to the game. Losing or declining to play brings an end to the game.

External links

1996 video games
Windows games
Children's educational video games
History educational video games
Video games based on television series
Video games developed in the United States
Works based on the Odyssey
Video games based on works by Homer